Tono Andreu (1915–1981) was an Argentine film actor. He was the brother of Gogó Andreu, who was also an actor.

Selected filmography
 Campeón a la fuerza (1950)
 The Phantom of the Operetta (1955)
 Hotel alojamiento (1966)
 Would You Marry Me? (1967)
 Aquellos años locos (1971)
 La familia hippie (1971)

References

Bibliography 
 Peter Cowie & Derek Elley. World Filmography: 1967. Fairleigh Dickinson University Press, 1977.

External links 
 

1915 births
1981 deaths
Argentine male film actors
People from Gualeguay Department